Radical 15 or radical ice, meaning ice, is one of 23 of the 214  Kangxi radicals that are composed of 2 strokes.

In the Kangxi Dictionary, there are 115 characters (out of 49,030) to be found under this radical.

 is also the 18th indexing component in the Table of Indexing Chinese Character Components predominantly adopted by Simplified Chinese dictionaries published in mainland China.

Evolution

Note that in modern Traditional Chinese, Simplified Chinese and Japanese, radical ice in some characters (e.g.) is now written as two dots. Their original forms are retained in Korean hanja and some old Traditional Chinese typefaces (e.g.).

Derived characters

In both Unihan database and mainland China's standard, the Simplified Chinese character  (=) falls under radical second (Unihan: , China:  or its variant form ) instead of radical ice.

Literature 

Leyi Li: “Tracing the Roots of Chinese Characters: 500 Cases”. Beijing 1993, 
 KangXi:  page 131, character 15
 Dai Kanwa Jiten: character 1607
 Dae Jaweon: page 294, character 11
 Hanyu Da Zidian: volume 1, page 295, character 1

References

External links

Unihan Database - U+51AB

015
018